Ethmia albifrontella is a moth in the Ethmiinae subfamily. It was described by Sattler in 1967. It is found in Afghanistan (Nuristan) and western Pakistan (Rawalpindi).

References

Moths described in 1967
albifrontella